

Schedule and results

Exhibition Matches
The Austin Aztex began their inaugural season as a professional team by playing 4 MLS teams in preseason exhibition matches. The first three games were held in Austin at Nelson Field while the fourth MLS match was in Rio Tinto Stadium on the MLS opening weekend. A fifth exhibition match was scheduled against the CONCACAF semi-finalist Puerto Rico Islanders in between their home and away series against Cruz Azul.

2009 U.S. Open Cup

Regular Season Matches

Road attendance numbers are italicized

Stats
Full Season

Field Players

Goalkeepers

GP - games played,  Min - Minutes played,  G - Goals scored,  A - Assists,  S - Shots,  F - FoulsGAA - Goals Against Average, GA - Goals Against, W - Wins, L - Losses, T - Ties, CS - Clean Sheets

See also 

Austin Aztex seasons
Austin Aztex
Austin
Austin Aztex